Liudvikas Narcizas Rasimavičius (born December 22, 1938) is a Lithuanian politician.  In 1990 he was among those who signed the Act of the Re-Establishment of the State of Lithuania.

References
Biography

1938 births
Living people
Lithuanian politicians
People from Alytus
Lithuanian legal scholars
People from Klaipėda
People from Palanga
Academic staff of Vilnius University
Vilnius University alumni